Nardosinone is a sesquiterpene and chemical constituent of Nardostachys jatamansi. In in vitro studies, the compound has demonstrated concentration-dependent enhancement of bucladesine and staurosporine-induced neurite outgrowth. Nardosinone has similarly been demonstrated to enhance NGF-mediated neurite outgrowth and synaptogenesis from PC12D cells.

Additionally, nardosinone has demonstrated cytotoxic activity against cultured P-388 lymphocytic leukemia cells.

References

Phytochemicals
Sesquiterpenes
Organic peroxides
Enones
Oxygen heterocycles
Heterocyclic compounds with 3 rings